Karthika Deepam ( Festival of Lights) is an Indian Malayalam television series which is broadcasting on Zee Keralam and streams on ZEE5 platform. It stars Snisha Chandran, Yadhu Krishnan, Vivek Gopan and Reshmi Soman in the lead roles. The series premiered on 13 July 2020.

Plot
The story revolves around Karthika, who is adopted by Kannan and Pavithra. Kannan is a hardworking farmer who aspires to see his brother Unni become a medical doctor. Unni is betrothed to Karthika before he moves to Banglore for his studies. After completing his studies, Unni returns home a changed person. He is no longer interested in Karthika and objects to their pending marriage. Kannan insists that Unni must marry Karthika. Unni instead falls for Vijitha

Vijitha is the daughter of Unni and Kannan's evil-minded uncle, Kallamasheri Karunan and Sudha. She is very rich and lures Unni by first giving him a car, and later has a hospital constructed for him, where Unni is the chief doctor. Unni's mother Kanaka is impressed by the Karunan's lavish lifestyle, and supports Unni and Vijitha's marriage. Karunan has Kannan arrested and jailed for possessing ganja. This leaves Karunan free to arrange Unni and Vijitha's marriage.

Meanwhile, Arun, a village officer, falls for Karthika. She is not interested in Arun, and frequently turns down his proposals of a happy married life with her. Vijitha starts to harass Karthika and Pavithra. She arranges for the local bank to seize Kannan and Pavithra's home, Madhillakam, and then buys the property and assumes absolute control of the house.

Vijitha is then surprised when Deepan (Akhil Anand), her boyfriend, comes from jail. He had been blamed for the murder of a girl Vijitha had accidentally killed after becoming jealous of her for being close to Deepan. Before going to jail. Deepan had threatened Vijitha to wait for him to return or he would kill her and her parents. Vijitha lies to Deepan and says she waited. She then plays a cat-and-mouse game with Unni and Deepan. Karthika discovers that Vijitha is cheating on Unni, while Deepan realizes Vijitha and Unni are married after seeing a marriage photo of them in a studio.

Karunan and Sudha encourage Vijitha to become pregnant by Unni in order to capture his attention. When she is unable to, Vijitha visits Dr. Nirmala, who suggests Unni is the cause of the couple's infertility. Vijitha asks Dr. Nirmala not to tell Unni, and Nirmala agrees. Vijitha further manipulates Unni by leading him to believe Pavithra and Pappan, Kannan's friend, are having an extra-marital affair.Vijitha loses interest in Unni and is unhappy to live with an impotent man. This tilts her towards Deepan

Pavithra's situation gets worse by the, and she eventually leaves Madhillakam with her daughter and Karthika. She is coldly welcomed by her brother and sister-in-law, who force her to work as a maid. Karthika is also forced to work as a maid, not knowing that it is Arun's home. Arun's sister-in-law, Malathi (who sees everything with suspicion) overhears Arun and Karthika talking to each other on the phone, and assumes they are having an affair. Eventually, Karthika leaves the job. Pavithra's brother then lures Karthika to a hotel with the promise of a better job. Pavitra learns of the news and informs Arun, who rescues Karthika and finally marries her. He leaves his household and takes Karthika, Pavithra, and Pavithra's daughter to a new home.

Meanwhile, Pavitra starts a new hotel and lives happily. Deepan, who is released from jail vows to take revenge on Unni. Deepan pretends to love Vijitha Vijitha becomes pregnant with Deepan's child but tells everyone that the child she is pregnant with is Unni's.

Meanwhile Arun's paternal aunt, Devananda enters. She dislikes Arun's constant rejection of marriage and decides to have him marry her younger daughter Malavika a.k.a. Malu. Deva catches Karthika and Arun red-handed but Arun due to his fear for her does not disclose their marriage. Deva makes preparation for wedding. Arun with the help of her advocate friend and the police officer disclose his marriage with Karthu. This leaves Deva shattered who breaks all ties with Arun

They decide to have a lavish wedding. But Deva plays a suicide drama and tells Arun to promise her that he will marry Malu but to save Deva Arun lies that Karthika and he have consummated their marriage and she is pregnant. A grand marriage ceremony is held.

Deva believes that Karthika is pregnant with someone else's child and she has trapped Arun in pregnancy. She decides to give Karthu some Ayurvedic medicines unknowingly to cause a miscarriage. Arun learns of the situation and after one more attempt on the child's life he tells Karthika to feign a miscarriage. Karthika then turns to a maid in the house. Deva then decides not to let Arun and Karthika live together so that a second conception could be avoided.

When Deva is hospitalised due to snake bite her friend psychiatrist tells that Karthika due to a rape attempt by Unni was reluctant to fulfil her duties as a wife had sought her help. Deva realises that Karthika and Arun had not consummated their marriage till then. Deva expels Karthika from the house. Kannan arrives their and takes her to his house. Kannan promises Karthu that she alone will be Arun's wife. Kannan decides to meet Deva in person. Here Kannan reveals the secret of Karthika's birth. He states that the face of the woman who abandoned Karthika resembles Deva's.

Cast

Main
 Snisha Chandran as Karthika Arun /Karthu
 Kannan and Pavithra's foster daughter , Arun's Wife
 Yadhukrishnan as Kannan
 Kanaka's elder son, Karthika's foster father and Pavithra's husband
 Vivek Gopan as Arun
 Karthika's husband
 Reshmi Soman as Devanandha
 Arun's Paternal aunt ,Karthika's biological mother

Recurring
 Amritha Varnan/Sumi Santhosh as Pavithra
 Kannan's wife and Karthika's foster mother
 Akhil Anand as Dheepan
 Kannan, Arun and Pappan's friend , Vijitha's second husband , Dr.Jeevan's younger brother
 Giridhar as Pappan
 Kannan's friend
 Kottayam Rasheed as Karunan
 Kanaka's brother ,Vijitha's father
 Jismy as Vijitha
 Unni's former wife ,Karunan and Sudha's daughter
 Sreekala as Kanaka
 Kannan and Unni's mother
 Roshan Ullas as Dr. Unnikrishnan/Unni
 Kanaka's younger son , Vijitha's ex-husband
 Malu's husband
 Vijayakumari as Sudha
 Karunan's wife and Vijitha's mother
 Divya Yesodharan as Manju
 Arun's sister-in-law
 Deepika Mohan as Malathi
 Arun and Anandhu's mother
 Sreelekshmi Sreekumar / Anjusha P G as Malavika
 Devanandha's youngest daughter
 Unni's second wife
 Rafi as Anandhu
 Arun's brother and Manju's husband
 V.K Baiju as Dr. Jeevan
 Nitha's husband , Karthika's biological father and Dheepan's elder brother
Jayasoman as Sharath
 Devananda's husband
 Malu's father
 Divya M Nair as Nitha
 Jayaprakash as Vishwan
 Karunan's friend
 Sudha Nair as Padmini
 Pavithra's elder sister, Manju's house maid
 Shyjan Sreevalsan as Susheelan
 Padmini's husband
 Bindhu Krishnan as Jayasree
 Jeevan and Dheepan's sister
 Kalabhavan Jinto as Sudhevan
 Jayasree's husband
 Haridas Varkala as Haridas

Cameo appearance
(in wedding episodes)
 Shiju
 Srinish Aravind
 Stebin Jacob
 Amala Gireesan
 Mersheena Neenu
 Sushmitha Prabhakar

Music
The title song was sung by Vaikom Vijayalakshmi and Nanjiyamma. The song been composed by Gopi Sundar.

References

External links 
 Karthika Deepam at ZEE5

Zee Keralam original programming
2020 Indian television series debuts
Malayalam-language television shows
Indian drama television series